"Don't Leave Me Behind/Silent Stream" is the sixth single released by Japanese singer Ami Suzuki in March 1999. It was also the first double A-side single of the artist. The single reached number three in Japan.

Information
For promoting the single and increase sales, the song "Don't leave me behind" was used on a TV commercial for the Japanese extension of Kodak on the Spring Campaign, and another song of the single, "Silent Stream" was used on a TV commercial for the juice drink, Bireley's.

After Suzuki was blacklisted from the music industry in September 2000, production and distribution of the single stopped in its entirety.

Track listing
Don't Leave Me Behind
Written by Marc & Ami
Composed by Tetsuya Komuro
Arranged by Cozy Kubo & TK
Silent Stream
Written by Marc
Composed & Arranged by Cozy Cubo
Don't Leave Me Behind (TV mix)
Silent Stream (TV mix)

Ami Suzuki songs
1999 singles
Songs written by Tetsuya Komuro
Songs written by Ami Suzuki
1999 songs